Belarus–Lithuania relations are foreign relations between Belarus and Lithuania. The countries established diplomatic relations on 24 October 1991, shortly after the dissolution of the Soviet Union. The two countries share  of common border. Lithuania's border with Belarus is the country's longest border. For Belarus it is its 3rd-longest border.

Vilnius hosts multiple Belarusian civil society organizations, such as European Humanities University, Belarusian refugees such as Sviatlana Tsikhanouskaya, remains of national heroes the two countries share like Konstanty Kalinowski and has been the birthplace of Belarusian literature (Francysk Skaryna).  Vilnius is the closest capital of an EU member state to Minsk. It is also the primary foreign shopping and air transit hub (via Vilnius and Kaunas airports) for Belarusians from Minsk and beyond. Minsk is the foundational place of Belarusian Lithuanian community organization, 1996 – Lithuanian Sunday school. In 1998, Lithuanian culture and art days were held here. In 2004, a Lithuanian school-course was established. In 2005 September 4 Belarusian Lithuanian Community Congress took place in Minsk. On the initiative of the Lithuanian association Vytis founded in 2012 (chairman Vladas Bublevičius), a Lithuanian language school for children has been held in the premises of the Lithuanian Embassy since 2013, courses for adults at the Maksim Tank Belarusian State Pedagogical University, in 2014 an evening of poetry and songs My Lithuania was organized at the Republican Center for National Cultures. From 2019 November a Lithuanian Sunday school has been operating in the Lithuanian language office of the Belarusian State Pedagogical University named after Maksim Tank. Grodno is a popular foreign shopping and tourism location for many Lithuanians due to its close proximity to the Lithuanian border and overall historical importance to Lithuania.

History

The current territories of both countries were part of the Kingdom of Lithuania, Grand Duchy of Lithuania (and subsequently the Polish–Lithuanian Commonwealth), the Russian Empire and, ultimately, the Soviet Union (into which Lithuania was incorporated during World War II).

On 20 December 1991, the Supreme Council of Lithuania recognized the independence of Belarus, with the same happening vice versa seven days later. On 30 December 1992, an agreement on diplomatic relations was signed in Minsk. The Belarus–Lithuania border is defined by a February 1995 treaty, with the ground demarcation of the border being completed in 2007. Belarusian President Alexander Lukashenko made two official visits to Lithuania in 1995 and September 2009. On 27 October 2010, President Dalia Grybauskaitė became the first ever Lithuanian head of state to the Belarusian capital of Minsk, as well as the second leader of an EU member nation to visit Belarus (Italian Prime Minister Silvio Berlusconi was the first). In April 2020, Lithuanian President Gitanas Nausėda and Lukashenko had the first tête-à-tête conversation in 10 years. In May 2019, former president and Member of the European Parliament Rolandas Paksas paid a visit to Belarus for the first time in an official capacity, discussing proposals to stabilize the military-political situation in the Baltic Sea.

Rifts in relations

Each country hosts opposition figures for the other, with Belarus sheltering coup-leader Vladimir Uskhopchik and Lithuania harboring Belarusian opposition figures. Lithuania has attempted to encourage a European orientation in Belarusian leadership, and has pursued trade deals and cooperation among law enforcement agencies. Sharing of information led to the arrest of Belarusian human-rights activist Ales Bialiatski, resulting in European condemnation of both countries.

Lithuania has been a vocal critic of the Astravets Nuclear Power Plant which was built close to the Lithuanian capital Vilnius. On 7 February 2019, the Meeting of the Parties to the Espoo Convention decided that Belarus had violated the convention in choosing a construction site for its nuclear power plant.

Following the Lukashenko government's crackdown after the disputed 2020 Belarus Presidential elections, which were widely regarded as unfree and unfair, Belarusian opposition candidate Sviatlana Tsikhanouskaya fled to Lithuania. On 12 August Lithuania opened its borders to all Belarusians for humanitarian purposes due to the crackdown on protests. Two days later on August 14, Lithuania became the first EU state to openly reject the legitimacy of Alexander Lukashenko as the President of Belarus. Lithuanian President Gitanas Nausėda said "We can not call Mr. Lukashenko legitimate because there were no free democratic elections in Belarus".

Following the Ryanair Flight 4978 incident on 23 May 2021, during which Belarus officials arrested two passengers, opposition activist and journalist Roman Protasevich and his girlfriend Sofia Sapega, the relations between the countries have further deteriorated. On 25 May 2021 Lithuanian parliament announced ban for all flights from and to Lithuania via Belarus airspace.

Belarus is reported to be the main source (93%) of illegally smuggled cigarettes in Lithuania.

2021 migrant crisis

In June 2021, Lithuanian officials claimed that Belarusian authorities could encourage illegal migration from Iraq and Syria to Lithuania by organizing groups of refugees and helping them to cross the Belarusian-Lithuanian border.  State-owned travel company Tsentrkurort was named as one of the performers of illegal migration. A number of roomy planes from Bagdad and Istanbul full of possible migrants were said to land in Minsk airport. Belarusian indepdendent journalists checked the airport and claimed that the majority of passengers arrived from Iraq and Turkey were men aged 30–50 who were met by two travel agencies. It was assumed that the state support of illegal migration could be carried out for political reasons. On 7 July 2021, Lithuania declared state of emergency due to influx of migrants from Belarus. Statement of Alexander Lukashenko about possible emergence of armed migrants was considered to be a threat.

According to investigation of Lithuanian LRT, the most frequent category of migrants, Iraqi Kurds, claimed that they were told that entering European Union via Belarus is legal. After a few days in Belarusian hotels migrants were collected, taken to the border and set the direction of movement on foot claiming that the car will wait them in Lithuania. It was reported that they paid up to €15,000 for travel and a US$3,000–4,000 deposit. According to the investigation of Belarusian reform.by, people from Middle East believe that they should destroy their passport in to avoid deportation from EU. Anonymous sources in Belarusian border guards claimed that their bosses started to encourage cigarette smuggling via checkpoints and to encourage gaps in border cover. Another border guard told reform.by about receiving a verbal order to turn a blind eye to illegal migrants.

In July 2021, Lithuanian Seimas passed a law (signed by president Gitanas Nausėda on 21 July) making deportation of illegal migrants from Lithuania easier.

On 18 January 2023, Lithuanian government renounced the agreement signed with Belarus on the principles of cross-border cooperation. The bill terminated the agreement signed by the governments of Lithuania and Belarus in Vilnius on June 1, 2006, to set out areas of cross-border cooperation between the two neighbouring countries.

Resident diplomatic missions
 Belarus has an embassy in Vilnius and a consulate-general in Klaipėda.
 Lithuania has an embassy in Minsk and a consulate-general in Grodno.

See also 
 Belarus–European Union relations
 Litvinism
 Lithuanians in Belarus

External links 
  Belarusian embassy in Vilnius
  Lithuanian embassy in Minsk (in Lithuanian and Russian only)
  Lithuanian general consulate in Hrodna (in Lithuanian and Russian only)
 Diena.lt -- Prezidentė Dalia Grybauskaitė Minske 2010-10-20

References 

 
Lithuania
Belarus